Christopher Randolph (born 1959 in Boston, Massachusetts) is an American actor known for providing the English voice for Hal "Otacon" Emmerich and Dr. "Huey" Emmerich in the Metal Gear Solid series. Prior to landing his role as Otacon, he auditioned for multiple parts, including Solid Snake. After David Hayter was recast from playing Snake in Metal Gear Solid V: Ground Zeroes, Randolph became the longest serving English voice actor in the franchise, having a role in all but one main Metal Gear Solid series game since 1998 (the exception being Metal Gear Solid 3: Snake Eater). He also writes, directs, and teaches acting. He received an MFA from the graduate acting program at UCSD.

His on-screen guest appearances include TV shows such as Will & Grace, Doogie Howser, M.D., Mad About You, American Masters and NewsRadio.  He's appeared on several soap operas, including Days of Our Lives, As the World Turns, and Guiding Light, where he continues to recur as ER Doctor Tompkins, and he has leading roles in the short films Convention, directed by Ryan Fleck (Half Nelson), and Pumpkin Hell, directed by Max Finneran. His numerous stage credits include King Lear on Broadway with Christopher Plummer, and many Off-Broadway and regional productions around the country. He is the brother of actress Tod Randolph, and singer/songwriter Nick Randolph of the group Stonehoney.

Filmography

Film

Television

Video games

References

External links

Living people
1959 births
American male film actors
American male stage actors
American male television actors
American male video game actors
American male voice actors
Male actors from Boston
20th-century American male actors
21st-century American male actors